The 2012–13 Bosnia and Herzegovina Hockey League season was the fifth season of the Bosnia and Herzegovina Hockey League (BHHL). Four teams participated in the league, and HK Stari Grad won the championship.

Regular season

Final

External links
 Season on eurohockey.com

Bos
Bosnia and Herzegovina Hockey League seasons
2012–13 in Bosnia and Herzegovina ice hockey